John Douglas Algernon Langley (25 April 1918 – 27 April 1996) was an English first-class cricketer active 1937–39 who played for Middlesex and Cambridge University. He was born in Northwood; died in Westminster.

References

1918 births
1996 deaths
English cricketers
Middlesex cricketers
Cambridge University cricketers